Mario Reiter (born 5 November 1970 in Rankweil) is a former alpine skier from Austria. He won the gold medal in the combined event at the 1998 Olympics of Nagano. He retired from alpine skiing after the 2000/2001 season.

World Cup victories

References

Austrian male alpine skiers
1970 births
Olympic alpine skiers of Austria
Olympic gold medalists for Austria
Alpine skiers at the 1998 Winter Olympics
Living people
Olympic medalists in alpine skiing
Medalists at the 1998 Winter Olympics
Sportspeople from Vorarlberg